Stylotermes halumicus is a species of termite in the Isoptera family Stylotermitidae.

Discovery
S. halumicus was the first species within the family Stylotermitidae to be discovered in Taiwan. Its discoverers first identified the species from the trunk of a living tree in Luanshan Village, Yanping Township, Taitung County. S. halumicus was named after the Bunun language word for pangolin, halum.

Reproduction
A colony numbering less than fifty individuals held in a laboratory began reproducing within six months of captivity.

References

Termites
Insects described in 2017
Insects of Taiwan